Gandomkar may refer to:
 Gandomkar-e Khalili, Chaharmahal and Bakhtiari Province
 Gandomkar-e Olya, Chaharmahal and Bakhtiari Province
 Gandomkar-e Sofla, Chaharmahal and Bakhtiari Province
 Gandomkar-e Vosta, Chaharmahal and Bakhtiari Province
 Gandomkar, Kohgiluyeh and Boyer-Ahmad